In graph theory, the (a, b)-decomposition of an undirected graph is a partition of its edges into a + 1 sets, each one of them inducing a forest, except one which induces a graph with maximum degree b. If this graph is also a forest, then we call this a  F(a, b)-decomposition.

A graph with arboricity a is (a, 0)-decomposable. Every (a, 0)-decomposition or (a, 1)-decomposition is a F(a, 0)-decomposition or a F(a, 1)-decomposition respectively.

Graph classes 

 Every planar graph is F(2, 4)-decomposable.
 Every planar graph  with girth at least  is
 F(2, 0)-decomposable if .
 (1, 4)-decomposable if .
 F(1, 2)-decomposable if .
 (1, 5)-decomposable if  has no 4-cycles.
 Every outerplanar graph is F(2, 0)-decomposable and (1, 3)-decomposable.

Notes

References (chronological order) 

 
 
 
 
 
 
 
 
 
 
 
 

Graph invariants
Graph theory objects